Campanula scheuchzeri is a species of  bellflower in the family Campanulaceae. The Latin name of the species honors the Swiss botanist Johann Jakob Scheuchzer (1672 – 1733).

Description
It forms solitary blue or purple campanulate flowers. They bloom from July to August.

Distribution
This species is native to Iberian Peninsula, France, the Apennine and the Balkan Peninsula, Central Europe and Romania.

Habitat

References
 Christoper Brickell (Editor-in-chief): RHS A-Z Encyclopedia of Garden Plants. Third edition. Dorling Kindersley, London 2003
 Pignatti S. - Flora d'Italia (3 voll.) - Edagricole - 1982
 Tutin, T.G. et al. - Flora Europaea, second edition - 1993

External links
Hortipedia
Luirig.altervista

scheuchzeri
Alpine flora